Epichostis is a genus of moths of the family Xyloryctidae.

Species
 Epichostis antigama (Meyrick, 1908)
 Epichostis barathrias (Meyrick, 1908)
 Epichostis cryphaea (Meyrick, 1908)
 Epichostis deltata Yuan & Wang, 2009
 Epichostis dicremna (Meyrick, 1908)
 Epichostis elephantias Meyrick, 1906
 Epichostis hamatilis Yuan & Wang, 2009
 Epichostis jiangkouensis Yuan & Wang, 2009
 Epichostis leptorthra Meyrick, 1931
 Epichostis leucorma (Meyrick, 1908)
 Epichostis magnimacularis Yuan & Wang, 2009
 Epichostis melanocona (Meyrick, 1908)
 Epichostis metrodelta (Meyrick, 1905)
 Epichostis microdelta Meyrick, 1928
 Epichostis proximitympanias Yuan & Wang, 2009
 Epichostis setilata Yuan & Wang, 2009
 Epichostis stelota (Meyrick, 1908)
 Epichostis subrotunda Yuan & Wang, 2009
 Epichostis termiprotrusa Yuan & Wang, 2009
 Epichostis termitruncatula Yuan & Wang, 2009
 Epichostis tympanias (Meyrick, 1908)
 Epichostis wenxianica Yuan & Wang, 2009
 Epichostis wufengensis Yuan & Wang, 2009

References

 
Xyloryctidae
Xyloryctidae genera